Organized religion, also known as institutional religion, is religion in which belief systems and rituals are systematically arranged and formally established. Organized religion is typically characterized by an official doctrine (or dogma), a hierarchical or bureaucratic leadership structure, and a codification of rules and practices.

Definition
Organized religion is distinguished from the broader idea of religion especially in anthropology, sociology and philosophy. American philosopher William James considered organized religion to be distinct from and secondary to religion in and of itself, stating that "out of religion in the sense in which we take it, theologies, philosophies, and ecclesiastical organizations may secondarily grow". James further comments that the essential elements of "institutional religion" are "worship and sacrifice, procedures for working on the dispositions of the deity [i.e.] theology, and ceremony and ecclesiastical organization".

Organized religion seems to have gained prevalence since the Neolithic era with the rise of wide-scale civilization and agriculture. Organized religions may include a state's official religion, or state church. However, most political states have any number of organized religions practiced within their jurisdiction. Due to their structured, standardized, and easily proliferated form, organized religions comprise many of the world's major religious groups.

In the modern era, the definition of the term 'religion' is becoming increasingly opaque, making the task of defining 'organized religion' difficult. Anthropologists, theologians and scholars have thus attempted to embed the idea of an 'organization' into the definition of religion itself. Some examples of this are found in the definition provided by Clifford Geertz, who defines religion as a "Cultural system." Furthermore, Max Weber's prominent definition of a religion includes the idea of a 'Church', not necessarily in the Christian formulation, but insisting on the notion of an organized hierarchy constituting a palpable religious body. Therefore, it becomes apparent that 'organized religion' has also been considered as part of the definition of religion itself, which in the modern era has caused a degree of controversy with the prominence of aforementioned personalized faith systems.

Examples
The Abrahamic religions are all largely considered organized (including Mainstream Christianity, Islam, Judaism, and the Baháʼí Faith), as well as some schools of thought within Indian religions (for example, Sikhism and Buddhism).

Religions that are not considered organized religions, or only loosely so, include many indigenous and folk religions, such as traditional African religions, Native American religions and prehistoric religions, as well as Modern paganism, early Christianity and Hinduism.

Statistics
In the United States, organized religion contributes $1.2 trillion USD to the economy annually, . 

Organized religion in America is heavily associated with community, with research demonstrating a causal "link between religion and civic activism".

References

Sociology of religion